Rogue is a commercial, TV, music video and documentary production company, originally organised under the name of Drum Films in 1974, as part of The Moving Picture Company. In 1983 Michael Green purchased both companies, making them part of his Carlton Communications. Renamed Rogue Films in 1992, the company became an independent entity in 1998, and represents award-winning British directors, such as Academy Award winner Kevin Macdonald (One Day in September, Last King of Scotland, Life in a Day) and Grammy Award-winning Sam Brown (music videos for Adele, Jay-Z and Foo Fighters).

In the field of commercials Rogue has won many awards over the years from festivals such as the Cannes Lions, British Arrows, and Creative Circle.

Commercials 

Rogue has created numerous award-winning commercials for clients as varied as Audi, Apple, Adidas, British Airways, BBC, Coca-Cola, Dyson, McDonald's, Google, Heinz, HSBC, NatWest, Nike, Levi's, Lloyds, Phillips, Virgin Atlantic and Virgin Media.

Music videos 

Rogue has created numerous videos for artist such as Adele, Jay-Z, Jon Hopkins, and Foo Fighters.

Online content 

Rogue has created and produced online content and interactive films for companies such as Ford, Jaguar, Lexus and Philips.

Film and television 

Rogue's film and television division has produced various shorts including Roundabout Five (2005) featuring Martin Freeman, Lena Headey, and Jodhi May; and Occasional Strong (2002) with Daniel Craig. Documentaries include 11M (in post production), and The Manager written by Nick Moorcroft.

References

External links
 MTV VMA 2011       BEST CINEMATOGRAPHY Adele – Rolling In The Deep
       British Arrows 2013: Bronze (Public Service Advertising)  Anti-smoking: THE ANSWER IS PLAIN
       Clio Awards 2013: Silver (Online)  Anti-smoking: THE ANSWER IS PLAIN
     London International Awards: Gold (Best Direction Music Video) Sam Brown
      British Arrows 2011: Silver (Vehicle Film Advertising) Audi – "Beauty and the Beasts"
      British Arrows 2011: Bronze (Best 30" TV Commercial)  Heinz – "Containers" 
      British Arrows 2011: Bronze (Canned, Frozen & Dried Food Film Advertising)  Heinz – "Containers"
 APA
 Mandy

English music video directors
Film production companies of the United Kingdom